Henry J. Klutho Park is an  public park, located between downtown Jacksonville, Florida and the historic neighborhood of Springfield. It is part of a network of parks that parallel Hogans Creek, Klutho Park being the largest. Klutho Park is home to an 18-hole disc golf course.

History

Formerly known as Springfield Park, most of the park was
created between 1899 and 1901 on land donated by the Springfield Company. The park also once housed the city’s first zoo, opening at the park in 1914. The Hogans Creek Improvement Project of 1929–30, designed by architect Henry J. Klutho 
(1873–1964) and engineered by Charles Imeson, turned much of the park grounds into a Venetian-style promenade. Klutho was a well-respected Springfield resident. His highrise buildings  
and use of the Prairie School style of architecture transformed Jacksonville after the Great Fire of 
1901. In 1984, the City of Jacksonville renamed portions of Springfield Park in honor of Klutho.

References

Culture of Jacksonville, Florida
Geography of Jacksonville, Florida
Parks in Jacksonville, Florida
Klutho Park
1899 establishments in Florida